Chellata is a 2006 Indian Kannada-language romantic comedy film directed by M. D. Sridhar and produced by Jagadish Kotyan under the Bhoomi Productions banner. It is a remake of the 2003 Malayalam film Pulival Kalyanam. The film stars Ganesh, Rekha Vedavyas and Devaraj. The soundtrack was composed by Gurukiran. The film had a low budget and was a success at the box office.

Plot
Ganesh (Ganesh) is the adopted younger brother of Devaraj. When Devaraj loses his right hand in an accident, Ganesh at a young age takes responsibility of his family. Devaraj's sister is in love with the son of Rangayana Raghu, who is unscrupulous and demands a huge dowry for the marriage to be made possible. To make this marriage possible Devaraj and Ganesh take a loan from a financier (Mohan Guneja) and invest it in an explosives business, only to lose it completely.

Simultaneously, Ganesh gets his phone muddled with Rekha (Rekha Vedavyas) on account of both the models being the same. Rekha's father   
Avinash is the boss of Rangayana Raghu. Ganesh and Rekha have loads of comical misunderstandings before falling in love and deciding to get married. Of course this is not acceptable to Avinash, and he puts obstacles in their way. The story is whether or not Ganesh and Rekha can overcome these obstacles.

Cast
 Ganesh as Ganesh
 Rekha Vedavyas as Ankitha
 Devaraj as Rudra, Ganesh's brother
 Rangayana Raghu
 Tennis Krishna as Dharmendra
 Umashri as Ganesh's grandmother
 Avinash 
 Komal Kumar
 Mohan Guneja as Madhu Maga
 Saritha Jain as Ganesh's sister

Box office

The film opened to positive reviews from critics and performed well at the box-office by completing 100 days.

Soundtrack

Home media
The movie was released on DVD with 5.1 channel surround sound and English subtitles and VCD.

References

External links
 

2006 films
Kannada remakes of Malayalam films
Films scored by Gurukiran
2000s Kannada-language films
Films directed by M. D. Sridhar